Ge-mare Farm Fields is a 4.1 hectare (10.3 acre) biological Site of Special Scientific Interest near Holford on the Quantock Hills in Somerset, notified in 1988.

The site consists of an unimproved species-rich flood pasture community with interest enhanced by the presence of a wetter area supporting a lowland mire community. These habitats are rare both nationally and within the county of Somerset.

References 

Sites of Special Scientific Interest in Somerset
Sites of Special Scientific Interest notified in 1988